Cadherin-12 is a protein that in humans is encoded by the CDH12 gene.

This gene encodes a type II classical cadherin from the cadherin superfamily of integral membrane proteins that mediate calcium-dependent cell-cell adhesion. Mature cadherin proteins are composed of a large N-terminal extracellular domain, a single membrane-spanning domain, and a small, highly conserved C-terminal cytoplasmic domain. Type II (atypical) cadherins are defined based on their lack of an HAV cell adhesion recognition sequence specific to type I cadherins. This particular cadherin appears to be expressed specifically in the brain and its temporal pattern of expression would be consistent with a role during a critical period of neuronal development, perhaps specifically during synaptogenesis.

References

Further reading

External links